Mount Weller is a peak (2,420 m) rising above the west side of Beacon Valley, 4 nautical miles (7 km) southwest of Pyramid Mountain, in Quartermain Mountains, Victoria Land. The name appears to be first used on a 1961 New Zealand Lands and Survey Department map compiled from New Zealand field surveys, 1957–60, and U.S. Navy aerial photographs of that period. Presumably named after William J. Weller, Royal Navy, a seaman of the ship In November 1903, Weller and Thomas Kennar (Kennar Valley, q.v.) accompanied Hartley T. Ferrar in the first geological reconnaissance of Quartermain Mountains.

Mountains of Victoria Land
Scott Coast